Francisco Cosme Sardinha (born 15 April 1946) is an Indian politician, who is serving as the Member of Parliament (MP), representing South Goa Lok Sabha constituency. Prior to that, he served as the Chief Minister of Goa from 24 November 1999 to 23 October 2000 and as the Speaker of the Goa Legislative Assembly from February 2005 to June 2007. He is a senior leader of the Indian National Congress party having won 6 times as MLA from Curtorim assembly and 4 times as Lok Sabha MP from South Goa constituency.

Personal life
Mr Francisco Sardinha was born on 15 April 1946 in Curtorim, South Goa district to Mr Caetano Sardinha and Mrs Rosa Maria Sardinha. He is married to Mrs Maria Columba Sardinha since 23 May 1976 and has 3 sons.

Political career

Sardinha was a member of the Goa Legislative Assembly from 1977–1994. He held many portfolios in the Government of Goa under the Chief Ministership of Shri Pratapsing Rane. He was elected to the 12th Lok Sabha in 1998 from Mormugao constituency in Goa.

He again became a member of the Goa Legislative Assembly in 1999 and remained in office till 2007.

In 1999, he broke away from the Indian National Congress and formed a new political party, the Goa People's Congress, and became Chief minister of a coalition government in the state. He remained in office till 2000.

Later, Sardinha's GPC merged with Indian National Congress on 5 April 2001. He became Speaker of Goa Legislative Assembly in 2005.

He was elected to the 14th Lok Sabha in a by-election in November, 2007 from Mormugao. He was re-elected to the 15th Lok Sabha in 2009 from South Goa constituency.

Mr. Sardinha is credited with many pioneering contributions in Goa's development especially in education, agriculture, and sports. In his last term as Member of Parliament (2009–2014), he was appointed Chairman of the Estimates Committee, the most prestigious committee of Lok Sabha. He was the 25th Chairman of the Committee since 1950 and one of the five longest-serving Chairmen.

Positions held

References

1946 births
Living people
People from South Goa district
Chief Ministers of Goa
India MPs 1998–1999
India MPs 2004–2009
India MPs 2009–2014
India MPs 2019–present
Lok Sabha members from Goa
Speakers of the Goa Legislative Assembly
Indian National Congress politicians from Goa